Kshetrimayum Ongbi Thouranisabi Devi is an Indian classical dancer and author, specialising in the Indian classical dance form of Manipuri. She was honoured by the Government of India in 2003 with Padma Shri, the fourth highest Indian civilian award.

Biography
Kshetrimayum Ongbi Thouranisabi Devi was born on 3 November 1946 at Singjamei Sapam Leikai, a small hamlet in the Indian state of Manipur to Leishangthem Tampha Singh, a polo player and Leishangthem Ongbi Ibetombimacha Devi, a known Nata Sankirtana exponent as their third daughter. She started stage performances at the age of 6, before she underwent any formal training. Later, she trained Ras Leela at Govindaji Nartanalaya (Government of Manipur Dance College) from the age of 10, passing the degrees, visharad and acharya and also trained under gurus such as Maishnam Amubi Singh, Amudon Sharma, H. Tomba, A. Tomba Singh, Lourembam Tombi Devi and R. K. Tomalsana before starting to perform professionally. She has performed at many art festivals in India and other countries such as Canada, West Germany, London, Dubai and USA.

Thouranisabi Devi is associated with Jawaharlal Nehru Manipur Dance Academy and has directed one of its ballet productions, Radha Sati. She taught at the academy for several years as Guru Rasdhari, Guruhan and Pradhan Guru till her retirement in 2006. She is also credited with two books, Diva Ras (2 volumes-1993) and Ras Makha Amsung Nungi Masahk (2006), both based on Manipuri dance and has recorded six albums for HMV.

Devi is a recipient of the Royal Robe from Maharaja Okendrajit Singh and a gold medal from the Government of Manipur. Manipur State Kala Akademi awarded her their annual award in 1977 and the Sangeet Natak Akademi followed suit with an award in 1980. Manipur Sahitya Parishad conferred the title, Nritya Ratna on her in 1981. The Department of Culture, Media and Sport, Government of India awarded Senior Fellowship to her in 1987 and she received a Certificate of Honour from the Government of Manipur in 1991. The Government of India honoured her with the civilian award of Padma Shri in 2003. She was also shortlisted for Padma Bhushan in 2011 though unsuccessfully.

Kshetrimayum Ongbi Thouranisabi Devi is married to Kshetrimayum Nawang Singh and the couple lives in the Manipuri capital of Imphal.

See also

 Manipuri dance

References

External links
 

Recipients of the Padma Shri in arts
Dancers from Manipur
1946 births
Living people
Recipients of the Sangeet Natak Akademi Award
Performers of Indian classical dance
Manipuri classical Indian dance exponents
Indian art historians
20th-century Indian dancers
20th-century Indian historians
Indian women historians
Scholars from Manipur
Women artists from Manipur
Artists from Manipur
Indian female classical dancers
20th-century Indian women artists
Women educators from Manipur
Educators from Manipur